Junqiao Wu is a Chancellor's professor of materials science at the University of California, Berkeley. Wu's materials science research focuses on semiconductors, electronic materials and thermal energy transport. Wu's research in semiconductors has led to major discoveries in the field, such as indium gallium nitride alloys have bandgaps spanning the entire near infrared to ultraviolet spectrum, electrons in vanadium dioxide conduct energy without conducting heat, a temperature adaptive radiative coating that automatically switches thermal emissivity, as well as a range of applications in solar cells, infrared imaging, photonics, and thermoelectrics. He received a BS degree from Fudan University, a MS degree from Peking University, and a PhD degree under Prof. Eugene Haller from UC Berkeley. He received postdoctoral training under Prof. Hongkun Park from Harvard University. His honors include the Berkeley Fellowship, the 29th Ross N. Tucker Memorial Award, the U.C. Regents' Junior Faculty Fellowship, the Berkeley Presidential Chair Fellowship, the US-NSF Career Award, the US-DOE Early Career Award, the Presidential Early Career Award for Scientists and Engineers (PECASE) from the White House, the Outstanding Alumni Award from Peking University China, the Bakar Faculty Fellows Award, elected Fellow from the American Physical Society (APS) and the 2023 John Bardeen Award from the Minerals, Metals and Materials Society (TMS). He is currently the chair of the Applied Science and Technology Graduate Group at UC Berkeley, and holds joint appointment at the Lawrence Berkeley National Laboratory.

Awards and honors 
 Ross N. Tucker Award, 2003
 Presidential Early Career Awards for Scientists and Engineers, 2013
Fellow of American Physical Society (APS), 2018
John Bardeen Award from the Minerals, Metals and Materials Society (TMS), 2023

References 

Living people
Year of birth missing (living people)
American materials scientists
UC Berkeley College of Engineering faculty
Chinese materials scientists
Fellows of the American Physical Society